

ad

ada-ade
Adacel
adafenoxate (INN)
Adagen
Adagen (Enzon) 
Adalat
adalimumab (USAN)
adamexine (INN)
adapalene (INN)
adaprolol (INN)
adargileukin alfa (INN)
adarotene (INN)
adatanserin (INN)
Adderall
adefovir (INN)
adelmidrol (INN)
ademetionine (INN)
Adenocard
Adenoscan
adenosine phosphate (INN)
aderbasib (USAN, INN)

adi-adv
adibendan (INN)
adicillin (INN)
adimolol (INN)
adinazolam (INN)
Adipex-P
adiphenine (INN)
adipiodone (INN)
adipiplon (USAN, INN)
Adipost
aditeren (INN)
aditoprim (INN)
adomiparin (USAN)
adosopine (INN)
Adoxa
adozelesin (INN)
Adphen
adrafinil (INN)
adrenalone (INN)
Adriamycin (Pharmacia & Upjohn Company)
Adrucil
Adrucil (ICN Puerto Rico)
adsorbocarpine
Adsorbonac
Advair Diskus (GlaxoSmithKline)
Advicor (Abbott Laboratories)
Advil (Pfizer)

ae-ai
Aeroaid
Aerobid (3M), also known as flunisolide
AeroChamber
Aerolate
Aerolone
Aeroseb-Dex
Aeroseb-HC
Aerosporin
afacifenacine (INN)
afalanine (INN)
afamelanotide (INN)
afatinib (INN, (USAN)
Afaxin
afegostat (USAN, INN)
afelimomab (INN)
afimoxifene (INN)
aflibercept (USAN, INN))
afloqualone (INN)
afovirsen (INN)
AFP-Cide
Afrin
Afrinol
afurolol (INN)
afutuzumab (USAN)
agalsidase alfa (INN)
agalsidase beta (INN)
aganepag (INN)
aganirsen (INN)
aganodine (INN)
agatolimod (USAN, INN)
Agenerase
Aggrastat (Medicure)
Aggrenox (Boehringer Ingelheim)
aglepristone (INN)
AgNO3
agomelatine (INN)
Agrylin
AH-Chew
AHA
AHF
Airomir (3M) [Ca], also known as salbutamol

ak
AK-Con
AK-Dex
AK-Fluor
AK-Mycin
AK-Pentolate
AK-Poly-Bac
AK-Pred
AK-Rinse
AK-Sulf
AK-T-Caine
AK-Taine
AK-Tracin
AK-Trol
AK-Zol
Akbeta
Akineton
aklomide (INN)
Akne-Mycin
Akpentolate
Akpro
Akrinol
Aktob
Akwa Tears